Salem Christian School is a private Christian school in Macungie, Pennsylvania in the Lehigh Valley region of eastern Pennsylvania. 

The school serves families and their children from Lehigh, Berks, Northampton, Montgomery, and Bucks counties.  The school primarily serves the Christian school market in the Lehigh Valley south of Allentown. The school serves students from preschool through high school.  As of the 2020-21 school year, the school had an enrollment of 164 students, according to National Center for Education Statistics data.

History
Salem Christian School was founded in 1979 with a class of 17 students.  In the years since, the school's building structure has expanded and its student attendance has increased to 200. As of 2015, the school was accredited by the Association of Christian Schools International and Middle States Association of Colleges and Schools. It states that its goal is to be the premier Lehigh Valley Christian school.

References

External links

Salem Christian School on Facebook

1979 establishments in Pennsylvania
Christian schools in Pennsylvania
Educational institutions established in 1979
Schools in Lehigh County, Pennsylvania